Inflatable habitats or expandable habitats are pressurized tent-like structures capable of supporting life in outer space whose internal volume increases after launch. They have frequently been proposed for use in space applications to provide a greater volume of living space for a given mass.

The first formal design and manufacture of an inflatable space habitat was in 1961 with a space station design produced by Goodyear (although this design was never flown). A proposal released in 1989 by Johnson Space Center's Man Systems Division outlined a  diameter spherical habitat lunar outpost which was partially buried in the lunar surface.

An inflatable module called TransHab (a portmanteau of Trans Habitation) was proposed for the International Space Station, and later the private company Bigelow Aerospace revived the design for use in a number of potential civil and commercial applications.

Construction
The construction of an inflatable space habitat is determined by its design objectives. However common elements include interwoven layers of highly durable materials such as Kevlar and mylar around a flexible air bladder which is used to retain an atmosphere. The shape of the module is maintained by the pressure difference between the internal atmosphere and the outside vacuum. The inflatable Bigelow Aerospace modules have an internal core which provides structural support during its launch into orbit.

Ongoing research 
Currently the main areas of research are being undertaken by Bigelow Aerospace and NASA. NASA is currently studying inflatable lunar bases with the planetary surface habitat and airlock unit which is in an early prototype phase, and has conceptual proposals for utilizing expandable-technology space structures in cislunar and interplanetary crewed exploration spacecraft.

Bigelow Expandable Activity Module

The Bigelow Expandable Activity Module (BEAM) is an experimental expandable space station module developed by Bigelow Aerospace, under contract to NASA, for testing as a temporary module on the International Space Station (ISS) from 2016 to at least 2020. It arrived at the ISS on April 10, 2016, was berthed to the station on April 16, and was expanded and pressurized on May 28, 2016.

Bigelow Commercial Space Station

The Bigelow Next-Generation Commercial Space Station, composed of two types of expandable space habitat modules, was announced in mid-2010. 
The initial build-out of the station was announced for 2014/2015, and would have consisted of two Sundancer modules and one B330 module.
Bigelow has publicly shown space station design configurations with up to nine B330 modules containing  of habitable space
The B330 is in final design with construction getting underway in 2011.
Bigelow began to publicly refer to the initial configuration—two Sundancer modules and one B330 module—as "Space Complex Alpha" in October 2010. 

Bigelow announced in 2010 that it has agreements with six sovereign states to utilize on-orbit facilities of the commercial space station:  United Kingdom, Netherlands, Australia, Singapore, Japan and Sweden.

NASA Multi-Mission Space Exploration Vehicle

In early 2011, NASA put forward a conceptual proposal for a long-duration crewed space transport vehicle which includes an artificial gravity space habitat intended to promote crew-health for a crew of up to six persons on missions of up to two years duration.  Called the Multi-Mission Space Exploration Vehicle (MMSEV), the partial-G torus-ring centrifuge would utilize both standard metal-frame and inflatable spacecraft structures and would provide 0.11 to 0.69 G.

Related to MMSEV is the ISS Centrifuge Demo, proposed in 2011 as a demonstration project preparatory to the final design of the larger torus centrifuge space habitat for the Multi-Mission Space Exploration Vehicle.

LIFE Habitat
LIFE Habitat (Large Integrated Flexible Environment or Large Inflatable Fabric Environment) is an inflatable space habitat currently being studied by Sierra Nevada Corporation. It is proposed as part of the Orbital Reef commercial space station.

Advantages 
 All other factors being equal, the aerodynamic load any vehicle is subjected to as it travels through an atmosphere increases with the square of its diameter. Therefore, a launch vehicle's diameter must be kept to a minimum to ensure a reasonably safe and fuel-efficient ascent through the lower atmosphere. In contrast, a vehicle designed to travel in a vacuum can be engineered without regard for aerodynamics. Because the diameter of the habitat is not strictly constrained by the diameter of the launch (and, if desired, re-entry) vehicle(s), inflatables can have a greater volume of living space for a given mass.
 Some designs offer higher resistance to space debris.  For example, the B330 provides ballistic protection superior to traditional aluminum shell designs. 
 Some designs provide higher levels of shielding against radiation.  For example, the B330 provides radiation protection equivalent to or better than the International Space Station, "and substantially reduces the dangerous impact of secondary radiation."

Flight experience 
The 1965 Voskhod 2 mission employed an inflatable airlock for the first ever EVA.

As of 2019, the only designs that have flown in space have been the Genesis I, Genesis II, and Bigelow Expandable Activity Module from Bigelow Aerospace.

See also
 Planetary surface construction
 Austere Human Missions to Mars
 Colonization of the Moon
 :Category:Human habitats
 Human outpost (artificially created controlled human habitat)
 Inflatable Antenna Experiment

References

External links

 NASA lunar colony idea
 Lunar habitat
 Inflatable lunar habitat study
 NASA history regarding inflatable space habitats

Space stations
Human habitats
Space habibat